Horsburgh Island (in Malay, Pulo Luar or Pulu Luar) is one of the Cocos (Keeling) Islands. There is a small lagoon in the interior of the island to the northeast.

History
The Clunies-Ross Family kept deer on the island for hunting.  In 1941, during World War II, gun emplacements were installed on the southern point of the island and manned by Ceylonese troops.  The Cocos Islands Mutiny began on this island.  The Ceylon Garrison Artillery on Horsburgh Island mutinied on the night of 8/9 May 1942, intending to hand the islands over to the Japanese. Surviving six-inch guns from World War II are listed on the Australian Commonwealth Heritage List.

This island is named after James Horsburgh, hydrographer to the East India Company and author of the long-titled "Directions for Sailing to and from the East Indies, China, New Holland, Cape of Good Hope, and the interjacent Ports, compiled chiefly from original Journals and Observations made during 21 years' experience in navigating those Seas". Horsburgh's Directory was the standard work for oriental navigation in the first half of the 19th century, until Robert Moresby's survey of the Archipelagoes of the Central Indian Ocean when for the first time in history accurate maps of atolls like Keeling or Cocos were published.

See also
List of islands of Australia

References

External links
http://www.awm.gov.au/journal/j34/cocosmutiny.htm